Atauddin Khan is a Bangladesh Nationalist Party politician and the former Member of Parliament of Dhaka-10.

Career
Khan was elected to parliament from Dhaka-10 as a Bangladesh Nationalist Party candidate in 1979. He was previously elected to the Parliament of Pakistan in 1965 as a Muslim League candidate. He served as the State Minister of Finance in the cabinet of President Ziaur Rahman. In 1980, he joined Janata Dal, founded by KM Obaidur Rahman. He served as the State Minister of Labor and Social Welfare. He was arrested by General Hussain Mohammad Ershad, who had launched a coup.

Death
Khan died on 1 December 2015. He was buried in Nawabganj, Dhaka.

References

Bangladesh Nationalist Party politicians
2015 deaths
2nd Jatiya Sangsad members
State Ministers of Finance (Bangladesh)
State Ministers of Social Welfare
State Ministers of Labour and Employment (Bangladesh)